was a town located in Nishiiwai District, Iwate Prefecture, Japan.

Hanaizumi village was created on April 1, 1899 with the establishment of the municipalities system. On January 1, 1955, it annexed the neighboring villages of Oimatsu, Nagai, Higata, Yushima and Wakutsu and was raised to town status. On September 20, 2005, Hanaizumi, along with the towns of Daitō, Higashiyama and Senmaya, and the villages of Kawasaki and Murone (all from Higashiiwai District), was merged into the expanded city of Ichinoseki and no longer exists as an independent municipality, and no longer exists as an independent municipality.

As of September 2005, the town had an estimated population of 15,357 and a population density of 121.1 persons per km². The total area was 126.83 km².

External links
Official website 

Dissolved municipalities of Iwate Prefecture
Ichinoseki, Iwate